Enemy of God can refer to:

 Enemy of God (album), an album by Kreator
 Enemy of God (novel), a novel by Bernard Cornwell

See also 
Moharebeh, Iranian designation for "enemy of God"